The Rât is a left tributary of the river Mureș in Transylvania, Romania. It discharges into the Mureș in Ciumbrud.

References

Rivers of Romania
Rivers of Alba County